Tuoba Yihuai (died 338) ruled as prince of the Tuoba Dai from 329 to 335 and again from 337 to 338. He was the son of Tuoba Yulü and the nephew of Tuoba Hena. When Tuoba Hena was in his first reign as the Prince of Dai, Tuoba Yihuai lived with his maternal uncle's father Helan Aitou (賀蘭藹頭) of the Helan tribe.

References 
 History of the Northern Dynasties

338 deaths
4th-century Chinese monarchs
Northern Wei people
Year of birth unknown
Princes of Dai (Sixteen Kingdoms)